The Metropolitan Railway A Class and B Class were  condensing steam locomotives built for the Metropolitan Railway by Beyer Peacock, first used in 1864. A total of 40 A Class and 26 of the slightly different B Class were delivered by 1885. Used underground, the locomotives condensed their steam, and coke or smokeless coal was burnt to reduce the smoke.

Most locomotives were withdrawn after electrification in the early 20th century, forty having been sold by 1907. The last one was withdrawn in 1948, and is now preserved at the London Transport Museum.

History

Construction
When the Metropolitan Railway (Met) opened in 1863, the Great Western Railway (GWR) provided the services with their Metropolitan Class locomotives. However, the GWR withdrew their services in August 1863, and the Met bought their own locomotives, which needed to condense as the line from Paddingdon to Farringdon was underground. A tender was received from Beyer, Peacock and Company of Manchester for building eighteen locomotives at £2,600 each that would be available in six months. The design of the locomotives is frequently attributed to the Metropolitan Engineer John Fowler, but the design was a development of a locomotive Beyers had built for the Spanish Tudela-Bilbao railway, Fowler only specifying the driving wheel diameter, axle weight and the ability to navigate sharp curves.

The  locomotives delivered in 1864 had  cylinders,  diameter driving wheels and weighed 42 ton 3 cwt in working order. As they were intended for an underground railway, the locomotives did not have cabs, just a simple spectacle plate. To reduce smoke underground, at first coke was burnt, changed in 1869 to smokeless Welsh coal.

The first 18 locomotives originally carried names, although the nameplates were withdrawn during overhaul.

These were followed by five more each year from 1866 to 1868, and six in 1869. A total of 24 of these later locomotives were delivered between 1879 and 1885.

The locomotives were numbered in sequence as they arrived, and in 1925 the examples built before 1870 were classified as A Class and those built after 1879 as B Class. When five Burnett 0-6-0 tank locomotives were received in 1868 for the St John's Wood Railway, they took the numbers 34-38, so the A Class consisted of Nos. 1-33 and 39-44. After the 0-6-0Ts were sold, the B Class reused the earlier numbers, becoming Nos. 34-38 and 50-66.

Running

Between 1880 and 1885, seventeen locomotives were reboilered at Edgware Road, and after 1886 this was done at Neasden Depot. Cabs were fitted after 1895, although these became too hot when working in tunnels and were not popular with crews.

Broken coupling rods were a cause of accidents in 1873 and 1884, and in 1885 the cross section was increased. The problem was eventually solved in 1893 when the original Allan motion was replaced by a Gibson & Lilley link motion, this being fitted to all locomotives by 1896.

In 1898, No. 62 was experimentally fitted to burn oil, but oil of the right quality for underground use was too expensive. In 1921, further experiments were carried out with oil burning.

The Metropolitan Railway A and B Class locomotives worked the whole of the Metropolitan Railway. In 1884, most of the locomotives up to No. 20 were stabled at Neasden, Nos. 27 to 33 were used on the East London Railway, the others from 21 to 50 were at Edgware Road and 51 to 66 at Hammersmith for the Hammersmith & City line.

Withdrawal

After electrification of the inner London lines in 1905-06, most of the locomotives were redundant. By 1907, forty had been sold or scrapped, No. 1 having been withdrawn earlier in 1897 after it was involved in an accident at Baker Street. Many locomotives went to R. Fraser and Sons for scrap by 1914, thirteen locomotives having been retained for shunting, departmental work and working trains over the Brill Tramway. The purchase of other locomotives, the closure of the Brill Tramway in 1935, and the transfer of freight duties to the LNER saw all but one of these remaining locomotives sold or scrapped around 1936. Class A No. 23 (LT No. L45) survived as a shunter at Neasden until 1948, and is now preserved at the London Transport Museum.

No. 22 was sold to the District Railway in 1925 and scrapped in 1931. Some of the sold locomotives survived a little longer: No. 7, sold to the Mersey Railway, was withdrawn in 1939, and No. 44 was sold to Pelaw Main Colliery in Durham and survived until 1948.

Livery
Originally, the locomotives were bright olive green lined in black and yellow. Chimneys were copper-capped with the number in brass figures at the front. The domes were also polished brass. It was in 1885 that the colour changed to dark red, known as Midcared, and the domes painted. Midcared was to remain the standard colour, and was carried on by London Transport in 1933.

Other Companies

Beyer Peacock built a number of  locomotives to the same basic 'Metropolitan' design, such as for the London and South Western Railway and the Midland Railway, with others being sold on by the Metropolitan to other railway companies including those mentioned previously. The following British companies owned and operated these tank engines, either from new or second hand from the Metropolitan (Excluding the District-owned machines):

- Sir Arthur Elvin is reported as purchasing two from the Metropolitan Railway for £190 each.

Overseas
As well as working in Britain, examples of the same basic pattern of Beyer Peacock s are known to have operated in Spain, on the Tudela–Bilbao Railway, and in Germany, on the Rheinische Eisenbahn (Rhine Railway). The eight Spanish examples were ordered from Beyer Peacock in 1862, before the first Metropolitan Railway examples, and later passed into industrial use. Five were purchased by the Rheinische Eisenbahn.

In 1877, the New South Wales Government Railways (NSWGR) ordered 34 locomotives with tenders based on this design from Beyer Peacock. Another 26 were built by Dubs and Co., and a further eight were made in Australia by Atlas Engineering in Sydney.

Models
A whitemetal kit in 1:76 scale was produced by Keyser (K's) and later from IKB Models. 3D-printed plastic kits for the Metropolitan and District variations have been produced by CDC Designs in 1:87, 1:76 and 1:43 scales. A live steam model runs regularly at the Acton Miniature railway.

References

Bibliography

https://www.rmweb.co.uk/community/index.php?/topic/145071-beyer-peacock-4-4-0ts/

External links

A
4-4-0T locomotives
Beyer, Peacock locomotives
Railway locomotives introduced in 1864
Condensing steam locomotives
Standard gauge steam locomotives of Great Britain
2′B n2t locomotives